SimEarth is a life simulation game, the second designed by Will Wright. and published in 1990 by Maxis. In SimEarth, the player controls the development of a planet. English scientist James Lovelock served as an advisor and his Gaia hypothesis of planet evolution was incorporated into the game. Versions were made for the Macintosh, Atari ST, Amiga, IBM PC, Super Nintendo Entertainment System, Sega CD, and TurboGrafx-16. It was re-released for the Wii Virtual Console. In 1996, several of Maxis' simulation games were re-released under the Maxis Collector Series with greater compatibility with Windows 95 and differing box art, including the addition of Classics beneath the title. SimEarth was re-released in 1997 under the Classics label.

Gameplay 
In SimEarth, the player can vary a planet's atmosphere, temperature, landmasses, etc., then place various forms of life on the planet and watch them evolve. In the “Random Planet” game setting, the game is a software toy, without any required goals. The big (and difficult) challenge is to evolve sentient life and an advanced civilization. The development stages of the planet can be restored and repeated, until the planet "dies" ten billion years after its creation, the estimated time when the Sun will become a red giant and kill off all of the planet's life.

There are also eight scenarios that do have goals, the first three (Aquarium, Cambrian Earth, and Modern-day Earth) involving managing the evolution and development of Earth in different stages, the next four (Mars, Venus, Ice Planet, and Dune) involving terraforming other planets to support life, and the final scenario (Earth 2XXX) involving rescuing life and civilization on a future Earth from self-replicating robots and nuclear warfare and giving the player the option of causing a great flood to help achieve this goal. In addition, there is another game mode besides Random Planet and Scenario mode, called Daisy World, where the only biome on the planet is daisies, which change their color relative to the temperature.

The game models the Gaia hypothesis of James Lovelock (who assisted with the design and wrote an introduction to the manual), and one of the options available to the player is the simplified "Daisyworld" model.

The player's control of the planet in the game is quite comprehensive; display panels allow the player to regulate everything from atmospheric gases, with percentages to three decimal places, to the rate of continental drift, to the rate of reproduction and mutation of lifeforms. In addition, the player is given options to place equipment or items that interfere with the planet's development, such as Oxygen Generators, which increase the amount of oxygen in the atmosphere, and the monolith, a take on the one found in 2001: A Space Odyssey, which aids in increasing intelligence of a lifeform through extraterrestrial contact.

The list of disasters ranges from natural occurrences, such as hurricanes and wild fires, to population-dependent disasters, such as plagues and pollution.  Effects on the planet may be minor or major depending on the current conditions. Increased volcanic eruptions, for example, increase the amount of dust in the atmosphere, lowering global temperature; earthquakes in a body of water may produce tsunamis; and the shortage of nuclear fuel for a nuclear power-dependent civilization may potentially trigger nuclear war and nuclear winter.

Global warming can cause the planet's ice caps to melt and sea levels to rise, but if a planet gets very hot, the oceans boil away until there are no oceans left, only land. A planet without any water can have oceans brought back if hit by an "ice meteor" (a.k.a. a comet). Many things have to be kept within a certain balanced range for a planet to be able to support multicellular animal life; outside this range, only single-celled lifeforms, plants, robots, and lifeforms that have been civilized can survive. This excludes most lifeforms in this game since most are multicellular animals that are not civilized.

All player-triggered actions have a cost specified in "energy units" or "omega (Ω) units"; for example, 50 energy units are required to lay down a single terrain square, while 500 units are required to lay down a terraforming device. The energy budget is determined by the level of development of the planet, and the chosen difficulty level; on the lowest difficulty level, the energy budget is unlimited.

Gameplay itself can be somewhat mystifying; species may thrive or die out for no apparent reason. Mass extinctions, however, are often followed by periods of renewed evolutionary diversification, allowing the player to experiment with new sets of species and ecosystems.

Taxa

A feature of the game is that all taxa of multicellular animals are on an equal footing, and thus it is possible to evolve, for example, sapient molluscs. The two single-celled lifeform taxa, Prokaryotes and Eukaryotes (or Bacteria and Amoebas, in-game respectively) are treated specially. Some examples of animal taxa include Radiates and Cetaceans as well as more well known taxa such as fish and birds.  As an "Easter egg", there is also machine life, which can appear if a city of the highest technology level (Nanotech Age) is destroyed by a nuclear explosion. Machine life can thrive in any biome or environmental conditions, generally out-competing any other lifeforms present, and can itself eventually evolve intelligence and build cities. Additionally, there are Carniferns, which are mutated, carnivorous plants, which can occur only naturally.  Having an abundance of insects allows for these life-forms to develop. Carniferns are able to develop intelligence just as animals can.  In addition to the familiar types, the long-extinct "trichordates" are included. The game states that "We [the game's developers]  felt sorry for them, and are giving them a chance for survival in SimEarth." Dinosaurs are another included taxa.

Civilization
Once an organism on the SimEarth planet becomes sentient and develops civilization, it will gradually go through different stages of development with each successive stage being more technologically advanced than the last.

 Stone Age, This stage is characterized by the use of stone tools and paleolithic lifestyles.
 Bronze Age, This stage is characterized by the use of bronze tools, the invention of farming, the development of writing, and urbanization.
 Iron Age, This stage is characterized by the use of Iron tools and is slightly more advanced than the Bronze Age.
 Industrial Age, This stage is characterized by rapid industrialization and improving living standards. This stage is where resources are being rapidly consumed. Once this stage is achieved, energy requirements are high and global warming starts to threaten your planet's habitability.
 Atomic Age, This stage is characterized by the use of nuclear energy.
 Information Age, This stage is associated with the mass use of telecommunication technologies and computers.
 Nanotech Age, This is the most challenging stage to reach due to depleting resources and the growing threat of global warming. It is associated with the use of nanotechnology and interplanetary space travel.

Development
Will Wright was introduced to James Lovelock by Stewart Brand, a former editor of CoEvolution Quarterly who lived near Wright, upon hearing about SimEarth. Lovelock advised the development team behind SimEarth, and particularly assisted with geophysical models. Lovelock stated in regards to the Gaia model that "Attempts to model the Earth through simple sciences such as biology or biochemistry fail because the models are oversensitive to initial conditions and prone to chaotic disturbance." Gaia models link biology and geology however, which Lovelock claimed are "for some reason stable and able to resist perturbations." Lovelock expressed that SimEarth's simulation has 'a degree of realism' despite it being "little more than a game", and he expressed that he hadn't seen or been involved in any computer simulations of nature on the scale of SimEarth at the time, noting that many professional climate models at the time didn't take clouds, the ocean, or biology into account.

Reception

Computer Gaming World called SimEarth "absolutely fascinating". The reviewer wished that the game had more SimCity-like visual feedback, but stated that it was superior to the predecessor because of larger scope and greater replayability. It won the 1991 Software Publishers Association Excellence in Software Awards for Best Secondary Education Program and Best Simulation Program.

Entertainment Weekly gave the game an A- and wrote that "While it's never too early to teach kids to respect the biosphere, the same may not be true of introducing them to complicated simulations such as Simearth: The Living Planet (FCI, for Super NES), which has more variables (temperature, precipitation, etc.) than a polynomial equation. There's something to be said for this, though: A task as simple as 'growing a daisy'—one option offered here—requires knowing far more than which button to push to cream the bad guy."

The One gave the MS-DOS version of SimEarth an overall score of 95%, and expressed that the game is fun 'regardless of whether you know what you're doing or not', and said that experimenting with the simulation is "hours of fun". The One praised SimEarth's substantial gameplay, expressing that the game has "near-infinite variations with which to experiment." The One noted the game as having "tremendous educational possibilities", but simultaneously being fun and engaging.

See also
Spore
Impossible Creatures
L.O.L.: Lack of Love
Seventh Cross: Evolution
Evolution: The Game of Intelligent Life
E.V.O.: Search for Eden
Creatures
SimLife

Notes

References

External links 
 
 

1990 video games
Amiga games
Atari ST games
DOS games
Biological simulation video games
God games
FM Towns games
Imagineer games
Classic Mac OS games
Maxis Sim games
NEC PC-9801 games
Non-games
Panhistorical video games
X68000 games
Single-player video games
Sega CD games
Super Nintendo Entertainment System games
TurboGrafx-CD games
Video games about evolution
Video games about microbes
Video games developed in the United States
Video games scored by Noriyuki Iwadare
Video games scored by Russell Lieblich
Video games set in prehistory
Virtual Console games
Windows games
Game Arts games
Tomcat System games